Donald Clegg (2 June 1921 – 2005) was an English footballer who played in the Football League for Bury, Huddersfield Town and Stoke City.

Career
Clegg was born in Huddersfield and played for his local side Huddersfield Town where he made three appearances before leaving for Bury in 1949. He spent two seasons at Gigg Lane making 15 appearances and the joined Stoke City in 1950. He played in just two matches for Stoke failing to make much of an impression, conceding five goals and was released soon after. He went on to play for non-league Yeovil Town.

Career statistics
Source:

References

1921 births
2005 deaths
Footballers from Huddersfield
Association football goalkeepers
English footballers
Huddersfield Town A.F.C. players
Bury F.C. players
Stoke City F.C. players
Yeovil Town F.C. players
English Football League players
Southern Football League players